Runa Khan is a Bangladeshi social entrepreneur and the founder and executive director of Friendship NGO. Friendship is based on Khan's model of "integrated development," meaning it addresses problems in multiple sectors, including health, education, disaster management and economic development in communities where it is involved, rather than specializing in one of these.
Khan won the Rolex Awards for Enterprise in 2006 for work through Friendship to preserve the declining craft of traditional boat building in Bangladesh.

In 1996 Khan established Contic as a tourism company which gives tours on traditional wooden boats. Earlier, she wrote text-books for children with the aim of moving away from rote learning, an effort that won her the Ashoka Fellowship in 1994. She is the Country Chair for Bangladesh at Global Dignity.

Early life and education 
Khan was born on November 17, 1958, to an aristocratic family descended from the zamindars or landowners of Bengal.  She studied at the Dhaka Preparatory and Farmview International Schools. She went on to study geography at the Lady Brabourne College, Kolkata and did a second BA in humanities from the Eden Mohila College in Dhaka. Runa Khan's grandparents came from a privileged background. Runa's mother's family was originally from Afghanistan. They were descendants of the Karranis, the last dynasty of the 16th-century Bengal Sultanate. When she was as young as 9, Runa's father, Alim Khan, used to receive Zen monks, Hindu priests, Taizé Brothers and ambassadors for dinner and include her in conversations about music and philosophy.

Khan was first married at the age of 20 to one of her direct cousins, and had two children before that marriage ended. Runa Khan wanted to continue her study on Geography and work. But, her first husband did not allow her to do that.

Later, on 1996, she married French adventurer and sailor Yves Marre, who brought to Bangladesh the river barge that would eventually become the Lifebuoy Friendship Hospital. Runa had a son, Jean, with Yves in 1998. Eventually, in 2019, this couple got separated.

Career 
In 1988, Khan started a boutique to provide work for Biharis and indigenous Bangladeshis. In 1992 she joined her family printing business. In 1995 she founded a security company. In 1994 Yves Marre arrived in Bangladesh with a retired river barge which he wanted to donate to a charitable cause. Khan's father first suggested converting it into a hospital. Khan created Friendship to carry out the project. The hospital ship was located to cater to the inhabitants of char areas, or regions with continuously moving landscapes, which were deprived of usual government infrastructure. Friendship NGO plans to launch 5 more hospital ships.

Works

References

1958 births
Lady Brabourne College alumni
Eden Mohila College alumni
Bangladeshi philanthropists
Living people
Ashoka Fellows